Anna Khaja is an American actress and playwright. She is known for her roles as Indira in AMC's post-apocalyptic horror drama The Walking Dead: World Beyond, Manisha Al-Jamil in the NBC comedy series The Good Place, Sita Parrish in Quantico, and Rachel in Silicon Valley. Khaja also wrote and starred in the off-Broadway play Shaheed: The Dream and Death of Benazir Bhutto.

Early life and education 
Khaja attended Castro Valley High School, where she starred in theater productions such as The Diary of Anne Frank and graduated in 1992. Khaja graduated from UCLA's School of Theater, Film, and Television in 1997.

Khaja is one of the recipients of the 2020-21 Black List and Google Assistant Storytelling Fellowship.

Career 
After graduating, Khaja played roles in TV series such as NUMB3RS, Weeds, FlashForward, and House. She also appeared in the Mark Taper Forum's production of the play Stuff Happens by David Hare. Khaja also originated the role of Nerjas in the U.S. premiere of the play Palace of the End. She received an LA Weekly Theater Award for Solo Performance for her work in the play.

Personal life 
Khaja is married to screenwriter Chris Rossi.

Filmography

Film

Television

References 

Living people
Year of birth missing (living people)
20th-century American actresses
21st-century American actresses
American television actresses
American film actresses
21st-century American dramatists and playwrights
American women dramatists and playwrights
American actresses of Indian descent